Todd Andrew Howard (born 1970) is an American video game designer, director, and producer. He serves as director and executive producer at Bethesda Game Studios, where he has led the development of the Fallout and The Elder Scrolls series.

Early life
Todd Andrew Howard was born in 1970 in Lower Macungie Township, Pennsylvania, to Ronald (Ron) and Priscilla Howard. His elder brother, Jeffrey Mark (Jeff) Howard, was later the director of creative affairs for Disney, where he oversaw the production of Bambi II. He developed an interest in computers, particularly video games, at a very young age. Howard considers the 1980s role-playing video games Wizardry and Ultima III: Exodus to be inspirations for his future games.

Education
Howard attended Emmaus High School in Emmaus, Pennsylvania, graduating in 1989. He then attended the College of William & Mary in Williamsburg, Virginia, where he majored in business while taking computer classes for credit. He graduated from William and Mary in 1993. Howard later stated that a business major appeared as the easiest path through college.

During the holiday break of his senior year in college, Howard obtained a copy of Wayne Gretzky Hockey (1988) by Bethesda Softworks. On Martin Luther King Jr. Day, he visited the offices of Bethesda Softworks, which he passed by daily on his commute to and from school. He asked for a job at the company but was rejected and told that he needed to finish school as a prerequisite. After graduating, he went back to Bethesda for a job but was rejected again due to a lack of job opportunities at the time. Instead, Howard started working for a smaller game company in Yorktown, Virginia, which enabled him to visit several conventions like the Consumer Electronics Show, where he continued approaching Bethesda to request being hired.

Career
Bethesda Softworks eventually recruited Howard in 1994 as a producer. His first game development credit for Bethesda was as the producer and designer of The Terminator: Future Shock (1995), followed by work as a designer on Skynet and The Elder Scrolls II: Daggerfall, both released in 1996. He was project leader for the first time on The Elder Scrolls Adventures: Redguard, released in 1998.

In 2000, Howard was appointed project leader and designer for The Elder Scrolls III: Morrowind and the expansions that followed. The game was released in 2002 and was a critical and commercial success, winning several Game of the Year awards. He then led the creation of The Elder Scrolls IV: Oblivion (2006) as its executive producer. After this, he served as game director and executive producer of Fallout 3, released in 2008.

Howard returned to The Elder Scrolls series to lead the development as the creative director of its fifth installment, The Elder Scrolls V: Skyrim, which was released in November 2011. He subsequently directed Fallout 4, released in November 2015, and Fallout 76, a multiplayer installment in the series that attracted criticism upon its release in November 2018. Howard will also serve as the executive producer of the upcoming game based on the Indiana Jones series of films, currently in development by MachineGames and Lucasfilm Games.

Opinions and recognition

Howard admitted in 2011 that The Elder Scrolls IV: Oblivion had sacrificed what made The Elder Scrolls III: Morrowind "particular", saying: "With Oblivion, we're dealing with the capital province, and we wanted to get back to the more classic Arena and Daggerfall feel of a fantasy world that felt more refined and welcoming. But in that, we sacrificed some of what made Morrowind special: the wonder of discovery." He said Bethesda's philosophy for The Elder Scrolls games was to allow people to "live another life, in another world".

In 2012, Howard also said he was favorable to modding in video games, claiming he did not understand why many developers do not allow it. In 2016, after the release of Fallout 4, Howard admitted that he was well aware of the criticisms received by the game, especially with regards to the dialogue system, saying: "The way we did some dialogue stuff [in Fallout 4], that didn't work as well. But I know the reasons we tried that – to make a nice interactive conversation – but [it was] less successful than some other things in the game."

Howard has been a frequent speaker at industry events and conferences. He spoke to developers at the 2009 D.I.C.E. Summit, sharing his rules of game development. He returned as a keynote speaker at the 2012 D.I.C.E. Summit. He said developers should ignore demographics and installed base, and follow their passions, saying that "if install base really mattered, we'd all make board games, because there are a lot of tables".

Howard's work has often received attention by the generalist media and press; his games have been featured in Newsweek, CNN, USA Today, and The Today Show. The high popularity of the games Howard has directed and produced has turned him, and some of his quotes, into Internet memes.

Howard was the 16th recipient of a Game Developers Conference Lifetime Achievement Award. The magazine GamePro named him among the "Top 20 Most Influential People in Gaming over the Last 20 Years". Howard also received the D.I.C.E. Award for "Best Game Director" in 2012 and 2016. In 2014, he was awarded the Lara of Honor, a lifetime achievement award from Germany. In 2013, IGN listed Howard 70th in a ranking of "The Top 100 Game Creators of All Time". He was inducted into the Hall of Fame of the Academy of Interactive Arts & Sciences in 2017. In 2020, Howard received the 2020 Develop Star award for "outstanding achievements and contribution to the industry".

During an appearance on Lex Fridman's podcast, Howard stated that he considers Tetris to be the greatest game ever created. He also stated that Ultima VII: The Black Gate is one of his personal favorites, and it had a large influence on the games he has developed.

Personal life 
Howard married Kimberly Lynn Yaissle, an elementary education teacher, on July 8, 1995, at the St. Thomas More Catholic Church in Allentown, Pennsylvania.

Works

Uncredited

References

External links
 

Academy of Interactive Arts & Sciences Hall of Fame inductees
American video game designers
American video game directors
American video game producers
Bethesda Softworks employees
College of William & Mary alumni
Date of birth missing (living people)
Microsoft employees
The Elder Scrolls
Emmaus High School alumni
Fallout (series) developers
Game Developers Conference Lifetime Achievement Award recipients
Living people
People from Pennsylvania
Year of birth uncertain
1970 births